The 2013 Victoria Curling Classic was held at the Archie Browning Sports Centre in Victoria, British Columbia from March 20 to 24 as part of the 2012–13 World Curling Tour. The event was held in a triple knockout format, and the purse for the event was CAD$76,000, of which the winner, Niklas Edin, received CAD$25,000. Edin defeated Mike McEwen in the final with a score of 9–8.

Teams
The teams are listed as follows:

Knockout results
The draw is listed as follows:

A event

B event

C event

Playoffs

References

External links

2013 in Canadian curling
Curling in British Columbia